Nirmala Rao (born 1959, Hyderabad, India) is a British academic and the current vice chancellor of Krea University. She also served as vice chancellor of the Asian University for Women, Chittagong, Bangladesh from 1 February 2017 to January 2022. and as Pro-Director of the School of Oriental and African Studies at the University of London from 2008 to 2016.

Early life
Rao was born in 1959 in Hyderabad, India.
She studied at Kendriya Vidyalaya Gill Nagar Kodambakkam, Chennai and competed her Higher Secondary there in the year 1976.

Academic life
Rao served as a Governor of Trinity Laban Conservatoire of Music & Dance.

Volunteer and Causes
Rao is a member of the Board of Trustees of the UK educational charity United World Schools.

Awards
In the 2011 Queen's Birthday Honours, Rao was appointed an Officer of the Order of the British Empire (OBE) for her services to scholarship. She was elected Fellow of the Academy of the Social Sciences in 2003.

References

External links
 Interview with Times Higher Education on 10 November 2016.

British women academics
Officers of the Order of the British Empire
Living people
1959 births
Delhi University alumni
Jawaharlal Nehru University alumni
Alumni of Westfield College
Academics of Goldsmiths, University of London
Academics of SOAS University of London
Vice-Chancellors of the Asian University for Women